The 10th Asia Pacific Screen Awards were held on Thursday, 24 November 2016 at the Brisbane Conventions and Exhibition Centre in Brisbane, Australia.

On 9 September 2016, five juries were announced. They are an Academy Awards winner David Puttnam, a former chairman of Busan International Film Festival Kim Dong-ho, a current chairman of Busan International Film Festival Nansun Shi, an Academy Awards nominee and a Palme d'Or winner Jan Chapman and a Palme d'Or nominee Shyam Benegal.

David Wenham and Anjali Rao was announced as the host of the event on 2 November 2016. On the same day, a Grammy Awards winner Sumi Jo was also announced to perform at the event.

Winners and nominees

Nominees for the Cultural Diversity Award was announced on 14 October 2016, followed by Animation, Documentary and Youth awards on 17 October and the nominees for the feature film was announced on 24 October 2016.

 Though they don't win, they're the winners of Jury Grand Prize.
 Though they don't win, they received a "special mention".

Multiple wins and nominations

The following films received multiple nominations:

The following film received multiple awards:

The following countries received multiple nominations:

The following countries received multiple awards:

References

Asia Pacific Screen Awards
Asia Pacific Screen Awards
Asia Pacific Screen Awards
Asia Pacific Screen Awards